The 2020–21 Boston University Terriers men's basketball team represented Boston University in the 2020–21 NCAA Division I men's basketball season. The Terriers, led by tenth-year head coach Joe Jones, play their home games at Case Gym as members of the Patriot League. With the creation of mini-divisions to cut down on travel due to the COVID-19 pandemic, they will play in the North Division.

Previous season
The Terriers finished the 2019–20 season 21–13, 12–6 in Patriot League play to finish in a tie for second place. They defeated Navy, Bucknell and Colgate to be champions of the Patriot League tournament. They received the Patriot League's automatic bid to the NCAA tournament. However, the NCAA Tournament was cancelled amid the COVID-19 pandemic.

Roster

Schedule and results 

|-
!colspan=12 style=| Patriot League regular season

|-
!colspan=12 style=| Patriot League tournament
|-

|-

Source

References

Boston University Terriers men's basketball seasons
Boston University Terriers
Boston University Terriers men's basketball
Boston University Terriers men's basketball
Boston University Terriers men's basketball
Boston University Terriers men's basketball